Subhasish Prodyut Bose (born 18 August 1995), is an Indian professional footballer who plays as a defender for Indian Super League club ATK Mohun Bagan and the India national team.

Career
Bose made his professional debut for Sporting Goa in the I-League on 6 February 2016 against Bengaluru. He came on as a 57th minute substitute for Nicholas Fernandes as Sporting Goa won 2–1.

On 8 July 2016, it was announced that Bose had signed for Sporting Goa on a permanent basis from Pune.

On July 23, 2017, he was drafted to Bengaluru for the ISL 2017-18 season. Over the season he became one of the most important players in Albert Roca's squad alongside Rahul Bheke. His efforts as a left-back earned him a spot on Stephen Constantine's list of probables for India's upcoming AFC Cup qualifier clash against the Kyrgyz Republic.

Bose signed for Mumbai City for two years at the beginning of 2018–19 season.

ATK Mohun Bagan
On 13th August 2020, he signed a 5 years contract with ATK Mohun Bagan.

Personal life
Subhasish married Indian actor-model Kasturi Chhetri in 2021, after being in a relationship for several years.

Career statistics

Club

International stats

Honours 

India
 SAFF Championship: 2021; runner-up: 2018
 Intercontinental Cup: 2018
 King's Cup third place: 2019

References

1995 births
Living people
Indian footballers
Footballers from Kolkata
Churchill Brothers FC Goa players
Sporting Clube de Goa players
Bengaluru FC players
Association football defenders
I-League players
2019 AFC Asian Cup players
India international footballers
ATK Mohun Bagan FC players